The Osha is a river in Omsk Oblast, Russia, a left tributary of the Irtysh. The river flows across lake Tenis.

References

Rivers of Omsk Oblast